Kanavu may refer to:
 Kanavu (school), an alternative school/commune in Kerala, India
 Kanavu (film), a 1954 Indian Tamil-language film